Bancigny is a commune in the department of Aisne in the Hauts-de-France region of northern France.

Geography

Bancigny is located some 50 km northeast of Laon and 12 km east by southeast of Vervins. It can be accessed by the D747 road from Plomion in the northwest which then continues east to Jeantes. There is also country road access from west, south, and north. Apart from the village the commune is entirely farmland with no other villages or hamlets.

The commune is traversed by the Huteau stream from east to west north of the village and bordering the Mill Farm northwest of the village.

Neighbouring communes and villages

History

Bancigny was called Bancegnies on a map dated 1205 and at that time the area was a lordship. The Bancigny area was made a County in 1590. During the French Revolution, Bancigny became a commune in the Canton of Plomion in the district of Vervins. In 1801 the commune was transferred to the Canton of Vervins in the Arrondissement of Vervins.

Administration

List of Successive Mayors of Bancigny

Population

Culture and heritage

Civil heritage
The commune has a number of buildings and structures that are registered as historical monuments:
A Farmhouse at Place de l'Eglise (18th century)
A Farmhouse at 2 Route de Jeantes (18th century)
A Farmhouse at Le Moulin (1808)
A Mill and Farmhouse at Le Moulin (1925)

Religious heritage

The commune has several religious buildings and structures that are registered as historical monuments:
The Fortified Church of Saint-Nicolas (16th century). The symmetry of the two towers can no longer be seen as the upper part of each defence tower was leveled in the period 1900-1905 as evidenced by postcards of the period. The Church contains two items that are registered as historical objects:
A Group Sculpture: Christ on the Cross between the Virgin and Saint John (16th century)
A Baptismal font (12th century)

See also
Communes of the Aisne department

References

External links
Bancigny on the old National Geographic Institute website 
Terascia, a specialised website for the Thiérache region 
Bell Towers website 
40000 Bell Towers website 
Bancigny on Géoportail, National Geographic Institute (IGN) website 
Bancigny on the 1750 Cassini Map

Communes of Aisne